The 30th Annual American Music Awards were held on January 13, 2003, at the Shrine Auditorium, in Los Angeles, California. The awards recognized the most popular artists and albums from the year 2002.

Performances

Winners and nominees

References
 http://www.rockonthenet.com/archive/2003/amas.htm

2003
2003 music awards